Cameron "Cam" Corbishley (born 31 March 1997) is a British race walker. He specialises in the 20 km and 50 km walks.

Career

2016 
In 2016, he competed in the men's 10,000 metres walk at the 2016 IAAF World U20 Championships held in Bydgoszcz, Poland. He finished in 24th place.

2017 
In May 2017, Corbishley competed in the 20 kilometres walk at the European Race Walking Cup in Poděbrady, Czech Republic. Finishing 36th, with a time of 1:27:26, this resulted in the British Athletics team finishing fourth in the team competition, their highest ever placing.

2018 
Representing England in January 2018, Corbishley took fifth place in the men’s 5000m walk at the Bratislava Elan meeting with a time of 20:16.44.

In March, he competed in the Lugano Trophy 15th Memorial Mario Albisetti 20 km held in Lugano, Switzerland, but was disqualified before the end of the race.

In April, he represented England Athletics at the European Athletics Race Walking permit meeting in Poděbrady, Czech Republic, finishing 33rd with a time of 1:32:47.

In August, Corbishley claimed the gold medal for the 3000m walk at the Manchester International Match, setting a Season Best time of 11:48.07.

2019 
In January 2019, Corbishley took the England Indoor title over 3000 metres in Sheffield, England. He also achieved a new personal best of 19:49.53 over 5000 metres when representing England in the Bratislava Elan meeting.

In March, Corbishley debuted in the 50 kilometres walk in Dudince, Slovakia. This performance set a new British U23 record of 3:53:20, the second fastest time ever by a Briton.

In May, Corbishley set a new personal best over 20 kilometres of 1:25:45 in the European Race Walking Cup in Alytus, Lithuania. Retaking three places in the final lap, Corbishley's performance, alongside Tom Bosworth and Callum Wilkinson, earned the British team a silver medal.

In July, he competed in the men's 20 kilometres walk at the 2019 European Athletics U23 Championships held in Gävle, Sweden. He finished in 12th place.

In August, Corbishley returned to Manchester, England to defend his title for the 3000m walk in the international meet, taking first place again in a time of 11:44.98, a new Championship Best Performance for the Manchester International Match.

In September, he competed in the men's 50 kilometres walk at the 2019 World Athletics Championships held in Doha, Qatar. He was disqualified after a fourth red card.

Achievements

Statistics

Personal bests

Personal life 
Corbishley studied a BA (Hons) in Philosophy, Ethics and Religion at Leeds Trinity University, graduating in 2018.

References

External links 
 

Living people
1997 births
Place of birth missing (living people)
British male racewalkers
World Athletics Championships athletes for Great Britain
Alumni of Leeds Trinity University
Sportspeople from Maidstone